Mary Ellen Sheets (born 1940) is the founder of Two Men and a Truck, a moving company located in Lansing, Michigan.

Biography

Career
Sheets was a systems analyst for the state of Michigan when her teenaged sons, Brig Sorber and Jon Sorber, started a small moving business. They used an old pickup truck to earn extra spending money in high school. When Brig and Jon left for college, Sheets took over the business. She purchased a 14-foot truck and hired two movers in 1985. This is the only money Sheets personally invested in the company.

A fellow panelist at a university business seminar in 1988 suggested Sheets consider franchising. The first Two Men and a Truck franchise was awarded in 1989.

At the end of her first year in business, Sheets made $1,000 in profit and donated all of it to charity. Ten non-profit organizations received $100. The company continues to support those same organizations today. To continue the spirit of giving started by Sheets, in 2000 Two Men and a Truck named the American Cancer Society its national charity. A portion of each move is donated to the organization. In 2009 the company donated more than $28,000 to the American Cancer Society.

Marriage and children
Sheets has three children: Melanie Bergeron, Brig Sorber and Jon Sorber, and is married to Tom Amiss. Bergeron is the chair of Two Men and a Truck, Brig Sorber is president and CEO and Jon Sorber is executive vice president.

Awards
1995: Michigan Entrepreneur of the Year Award
1998: Blue Chip Award
2002: Athena Award
2004: Entrepreneur of the Year, International Franchise Association
2008: J.D. Power and Associates (August 26, 2008) "J.D. Power and Associates Reports: Two Men and a Truck Ranks Highest in Customer Satisfaction with Full-Service Moving Companies"

References

1940 births
Living people
Businesspeople from Lansing, Michigan
20th-century American businesspeople
20th-century American businesswomen
21st-century American businesspeople
21st-century American businesswomen